Government College Nedumangad is an educational institution in Nedumangad Thiruvananthapuram, Kerala, . The College is affiliated to  Kerala University and is a special grade College under the Department of Collegiate Education, Government of Kerala. The college has been accredited by NAAC. It provides graduate and postgraduate education in Arts and Commerce subjects. The college is affiliated with Kerala University.

College history

Nedumangad Govt. College started functioning on 28-8-1981. The College was inaugurated by the chief minister of Kerala Sri  E. K. Nayanar on 16 September 1981 at a function in which a large number of students, parents & the public participated.  Prof.K.Sreedharan Nair took charge as principal on the F.N. of 28-8-1981.  Classes were started on 22 September 1981.  After nine years, the college started functioning in the new site (Akkottupara)   from the 3rd term of 1989-90 and the buildings were formally inaugurated by the chief minister of Kerala on 14-2-1990.

Location

College is just 2 km away from Nedumangad town where it will take less than 10 minute to reach the college from town. KSRTC Bus accessibility to reach college is very good.

Departments

Commerce
Computer Science 
Economics
Malayalam
English
Mathematics
Hindi
History
Physical Education
Physics
Political Science
Statistics
Sanskrit

Courses

Graduate Programs

BA in Economics
BA in History
BA in Malayalam
BSc in Maths
BSc (Physics with Computer Applications)
BCom

Post-Graduate Programs

MA in History
MCom
MA Malayalam
MA Economics

Notable alumni
 Sankar   ( V R Sankar ), Film director, Screen writer and Novelist

References

External links
college in wikimap
List of colleges affiliated to University of Kerala
'Wikipedia' Nedumangadu article
' Entecity' page
university' affiliation 
website'page

1981 establishments in Kerala
Arts and Science colleges in Kerala
Universities and colleges in Thiruvananthapuram district
Educational institutions established in 1981
Colleges affiliated to the University of Kerala